is a Japanese manga series written and illustrated by Yoichi Abe. It has been published in Fujimi Shobo's Bessatsu Dragon Age (rebranded as Young Dragon Age in 2019) since September 2017.

Publication
Kadokawa released the first tankōbon volume on July 9, 2020. As of January 7, 2023, two volumes have been released.

The manga is licensed for English release in North America by Seven Seas Entertainment.

Volume list

References

Further reading

External links
 

Dark fantasy anime and manga
Fujimi Shobo manga
Romantic comedy anime and manga
Seinen manga
Seven Seas Entertainment titles
Supernatural anime and manga